A transfer case is a part of the drivetrain of four-wheel-drive, all-wheel-drive, and other multiple powered axle vehicles.  The transfer case transfers power from the transmission to the front and rear axles by means of drive shafts. It also synchronizes the difference between the rotation of the front and rear wheels, and may contain one or more sets of low range gears for off-road use.

Functions
 The transfer case receives power from the transmission and sends it to both the front and rear axles, or just one (usually the rear.)  This can be done with gears, hydraulics, or chain drive.  On some vehicles, such as four-wheel-drive trucks or vehicles intended for off-road use, this feature is controlled by the driver.  The driver can put the transfer case into either "two-wheel-drive" or "four-wheel-drive" mode.  This is sometimes accomplished by means of a shifter, similar to that in a manual transmission.  On some vehicles, this may be electronically operated by a switch instead.  Some vehicles, such as all-wheel-drive sports cars, have transfer cases that are not selectable.  Such a transfer case is permanently "locked" into all-wheel-drive mode.
 Transfer cases that are designed to allow for normal road use synchronize the difference between the rotation of the front and rear wheels, in much the same way the differential acts on a given axle. This is necessary because the front and rear tires never turn at the same speed.  Different rates of tire rotation are generally due to different tire diameters (since the front and rear tires inevitably wear at different rates) and different gear ratios in the front and rear differentials since manufacturers will often have a slightly lower ratio in the front vs. the rear to help with control (such as a 3.55:1 in the rear differential and a 3.54:1 in the front differential).  If the transfer case did not make up the difference between the two different rates of rotation, binding would occur and the transfer case could become damaged.  This is also why a transfer case that is not designed for on-road use will cause problems with driveline windup if driven on dry pavement.
 Transfer cases designed for off-road use can mechanically lock the front and rear drive shafts when the driver selects (e.g. when one of the axles is on a slippery surface or stuck in the mud, whereas the other has better traction). This is the equivalent to the differential lock.
 The transfer case may contain one or more sets of low range gears for off-road use.  Low range gears are engaged with a shifter or electronic switch. In many transfer cases, this shifter is the same as the one that selects 2WD or 4WD operation.  Low range gears allow the vehicle to drive at much slower speeds while still operating within the usable power band / RPM range of the engine.  This also increases the torque available at the axles.  Low-range gears are used for very inclement road conditions, towing a heavy load slowly, driving on rough, unimproved roads slowly, and extreme off-road maneuvers such as rockcrawling.  This feature is often absent on all-wheel-drive cars.  Some very large vehicles, such as heavy equipment or military trucks, may have more than one low-range gear.

Types
Transfer cases used on "part-time" four-wheel-drive off-road vehicles such as trucks, truggies, rock-crawling vehicles and some military vehicles generally allow the driver to select 2WD or 4WD, as well as high or low gear ranges. Those used in sports cars and performance sedans are usually "transparent" to the driver; there is no shifter or select lever.

Drive types

Gear-driven
There are two different types of internal power-transfer mechanisms found in most transfer cases. Gear-driven transfer cases use sets of gears to drive either the front or both the front and rear driveshafts. These are generally strong, heavy units that are used in large trucks, but there are currently several gear drive cases in production for passenger cars.

Chain-driven
Chain-driven transfer cases use a chain to drive most often only one axle but can drive both axles. Chain-driven transfer cases are quieter and lighter than gear-driven ones.  They are used in vehicles such as compact trucks, full-size trucks, Jeeps, and SUVs.  Some off-road driving enthusiasts modify their vehicles to use gear-driven transfer cases, accepting the additional weight and noise to gain the extra strength they generally provide.

Housing type

Married
Transfer cases are also classified as either "divorced"/independent or "married". Married transfer cases are bolted directly to the transmission, usually between the transmission's output shaft and the rear or main driveshaft. Sometimes a married transfer case is an integral part of the transmission and the two components share the same housing or "case", as is commonly found on recent Subaru products and some other all-wheel-drive cars.

Divorced/independent
A divorced or independent transfer case is completely separate from the transmission. It is located further down the driveline than a married transfer case and connected to the transmission output shaft by a short driveshaft.  Independent transfer cases are used on very long wheelbase vehicles, such as commercial trucks or military trucks. This setup is also optimal for modified 4x4 because it's easier to change engine and transmissions, preserving the original 4WD system.

Transfer case shift type

M.S.O.F.
Manual Shift On-the-Fly transfer cases have a selector lever on the driver's side floor transmission hump and may also have either two sealed automatic front axle locking hubs or two manual front axle hub selectors of "LOCK" and "UNLOCK" or "FREE".  To engage the four-wheel-drive system the vehicle must be moving at a low speed.  The speed at which 4x4 can be engaged depends on the vehicle.  This is only for the four-wheel-drive high setting.  To engage the four-wheel-drive low setting, the vehicle must be stopped and the transmission must be shifted to neutral, then the four-wheel-drive low can be selected.

E.S.O.F.
Electronic Shift On-the-Fly (ESOF) transfer cases have a dash-mounted selector switch or buttons with front sealed automatic locking axle hubs or drive flanges.  Unlike the manual transfer case, this system has a transfer case motor.  To engage the four-wheel-drive system the vehicle must be moving at a lower speed.  The speed at which 4x4 can be engaged depends on the vehicle.  This is only for the four-wheel-drive high setting. To engage the four-wheel-drive low setting, the vehicle must be stopped and the transmission must be shifted to neutral, then the four-wheel-drive low can be selected.

See also

AMC/Jeep Transmissions
Clutch
 Gear box
Jeep four wheel drive systems
Mitsubishi Super Select
NP-205

References

Vehicle technology
Four-wheel drive layout